The Peruvian Cycling Federation (in Spanish: Federación Deportiva Peruana de Ciclismo) is the national governing body of cycle racing in Peru.

It is a member of the UCI and COPACI.

External links
 Federación Deportiva Peruana de Ciclismo official website

Cycle racing organizations
Cycle racing in Peru
Cyc